"The Heart Part 4" is a song by American hip hop recording artist Kendrick Lamar. It was released on March 23, 2017, by Top Dawg Entertainment. The track features uncredited vocals from American singer Khalid. 
The song contains samples from "Don't Tell a Lie about Me and I Won't Tell the Truth on You" by James Brown and "I Love You" by Faith Evans.

Background and release
On March 23, 2017, Lamar shared an Instagram post of the Roman numeral "IV" after deleting his prior Instagram posts. That night, Lamar released the song through streaming services.

This is the fourth installment in Lamar's "The Heart" song series. "The Heart Part 1" was released as a loose track in April 2010, while "Part 2" was featured on Lamar's Overly Dedicated mixtape, released later that same year. "Part 3," featuring Ab-Soul and Jay Rock, preceded the release of good kid, m.A.A.d city in 2012. In 2022, The Heart Part 5 was released as a promotional single to promote his fifth studio album.

He finishes the song with the line, "Y'all got til April the 7th to get y'all shit together", hinting at the release date for his fourth album (the date turned out to be the day pre-orders opened and the release date was announced to be April 14). The song mentions Donald Trump, while media outlets perceived it as a diss track to rappers Drake and Big Sean.

A portion of the instrumental, produced by The Alchemist, is used on the song "Fear" from Lamar's fourth album Damn (2017).

Critical reception
On the day of its release, Pitchfork named it Best New Track. For Entertainment Weeklys Eric Renner Brown, Lamar "infuses his boasts of success and wealth with a degree of lyrical nuance that elevates the track."

Charts

References

2017 songs
Kendrick Lamar songs
Songs written by Kendrick Lamar
Song recordings produced by the Alchemist (musician)
Top Dawg Entertainment singles
Sequel songs
Songs about Donald Trump
Songs written by Khalid (singer)
Songs written by DJ Dahi
Songs written by The Alchemist (musician)